Bajerovce is a village and municipality in Sabinov District in the Prešov Region of north-eastern Slovakia.
In historical records, the village was first mentioned in 1366. Ruthenians, settled here in the 1570s, were the main inhabitants of the village in recent centuries.
The municipality lies at an altitude of 679 metres and covers an area of  (2020-06-30/-07-01). It has a population of about 354 people (293 Slovaks and 60 Ruthenians) in 2001.

Genealogical resources

The records for genealogical research are available at the state archive "Statny Archiv in Presov, Slovakia"

 Roman Catholic church records (births/marriages/deaths): 1753-1895
 Greek Catholic church records (births/marriages/deaths): 1825–1851, 1875-1895 (parish A)
 Census records 1869 of Bajerovce are available at the state archive.

See also
 List of municipalities and towns in Slovakia

References

External links
Bajerovce - The Carpathian Connection
https://web.archive.org/web/20100202015957/http://www.statistics.sk/mosmis/eng/run.html
Surnames of living people in Bajerovce

Villages and municipalities in Sabinov District
Šariš